Toxicodendron vernix, commonly known as poison sumac, or swamp-sumach, is a woody shrub or small tree growing to 9 metres (30 feet) tall. It was previously known as Rhus vernix. This plant is also known as thunderwood, particularly where it occurs in the southern United States. All parts of the plant contain a resin called urushiol that causes skin and mucous membrane irritation to humans. When the plant is burned, inhalation of the smoke may cause the rash to appear on the lining of the lungs, causing extreme pain and possibly fatal respiratory difficulty.

Description

These are oval-to-oblong; acuminate (tapering to a sharp point); cuneate (wedge-shaped) at the base; undulate (wavy-edged); with an underside that is glabrous (hairless) or slightly pubescent (down-like hair) beneath. The stems along the leaflets are red and the leaves can have a reddish tint to them, particularly at the top of the plant. New bark for a poison sumac tree is lightish gray, and as the bark ages, it becomes darker.

Poison sumac fruit are creamy white and part of a cluster.

Distribution and habitat
Poison sumac grows exclusively in wet and clay soils, usually in swamps and peat bogs, in the eastern United States and extreme southeast Canada.

Ecology
The fruit and leaves of the poison sumac plant contain urushiol, an oil that causes an allergic rash upon contact with skin. They are, however, not toxic to birds or other animals, and eaten by them when other food is scarce, especially in winter.

Toxicity

In terms of its potential to cause urushiol-induced contact dermatitis, poison sumac is more toxic than its relatives poison ivy and poison oak. 

The differences in toxicity in poison ivy, poison oak, and poison sumac are due to differences in the side chains of the chemicals in these plants. In general, poison ivy has a C15 side chain, poison oak has a C17 side chain and poison sumac has a C13 side chain.

The dermatitis shows itself in painful and long continued swellings and eruptions. In the worst case, smoke inhaled by burning poison sumac leads to life-threatening pulmonary edema whereby fluid enters the alveoli.

See also 
 Toxicodendron – genus
 Tecnu  - skin cleanser

References

Further reading
 
 
 
 .

External links

 Poison ivy / oak / sumac in "The Medicinal Herb FAQ".
 The Poison Sumac Page—Photos and facts about poison sumac.
 Poison Oak at Wayne's Word.
 Toxicodendron vernix

vernix
Flora of North America
Poisonous plants